Ant-Man (Scott Lang) is a  fictional character appearing in American comic books published by Marvel Comics. Created by David Michelinie, Bob Layton and John Byrne, Scott Lang first appeared in The Avengers #181 (March 1979) and in Marvel Premiere #47 (April 1979) as the second superhero character to use the Ant-Man name in the Marvel Universe. He is a reformed thief and an electronics expert. He was a member of the Avengers, the Fantastic Four and the Guardians of the Galaxy, the main character in the comic-book series FF and, in 2015, he became the title character in the series Ant-Man.

Scott Lang is an ex-convict and electronics expert hired by Stark International, which enables him to steal the Ant-Man suit from Hank Pym, who had long since given up the name, to help his sick daughter. When Pym finds out, he gives the suit to Lang, allowing him to become the second Ant-Man. As Ant-Man, he serves as an Avenger for years, until he is killed during the Avengers Disassembled storyline. Years later, he is resurrected in the Avengers: The Children's Crusade mini-series. Following his resurrection, Lang heads the Future Foundation and founds his own company, the Ant-Man Security Solutions.

Paul Rudd plays Scott Lang in the Marvel Cinematic Universe films Ant-Man (2015), Captain America: Civil War (2016), Ant-Man and the Wasp (2018), Avengers: Endgame (2019), and Ant-Man and the Wasp: Quantumania (2023), the web series WHIH Newsfront (2015), and the animated series What If...? (2021).

Publication history
Created by David Michelinie, Bob Layton and John Byrne, Scott Lang first appeared in The Avengers #181 (cover-dated March 1979) and as the second Ant-Man in Marvel Premiere #47 (April 1979). Michelinie had long been an enthusiast of shrinking heroes, and saw Hank Pym's return to the Yellowjacket guise as an opportunity to take over the discarded Ant-Man identity. He explained how he came up with the character: 

Though Ant-Man's two-issue tryout in Marvel Premiere failed to garner the character his own series, the dynamic of a single father and reformed criminal in the superhero role struck a chord with readers and led to Ant-Man enjoying modest popularity and frequent appearances in Marvel Comics thereafter.

Ant-Man appeared prominently in the 2012's FF series by Matt Fraction and Mike Allred.

An ongoing series focusing on Lang, titled simply Ant-Man written by Nick Spencer and drawn by Ramon Rosanas, began in January 2015. After Marvel's Secret Wars event, the series continued with the title Astonishing Ant-Man.

Fictional character biography

Early life
Scott Edward Harris Lang was born in Coral Gables, Florida. A movie fanatic, he turned to burglary when his occupation as an electrical engineer failed to  provide him with enough excitement in life. (This was later retconned with the statement that he did so because he could not support his family.) Apprehended, Lang served his prison sentence and was paroled after four years for good behavior. In prison, he furthered his study of electronics and was soon hired by Stark International to work in its design department. Under Tony Stark's direction, he helped install a new security system in Avengers Mansion.

The second Ant-Man
When his daughter Cassie became seriously ill, Scott Lang sought out Dr. Erica Sondheim, the only person capable of helping her. However, at the very moment he attempted to contact her, Sondheim was forcibly taken away to Cross Technological Enterprises, and in order to get her out, he decided to return to burglary as a final resort. He broke into Hank Pym's home and stole the Ant-Man suit and shrinking gas canisters. Garbed as Ant-Man, Lang broke into Cross Enterprises and discovered that Sondheim was being held prisoner by Darren Cross. He rescued the doctor from Cross' clutches and was relieved when Sondheim was able to save his beloved Cassie's life. Upon being confronted by Pym (as Yellowjacket), Lang intended to return the Ant-Man suit to Pym and turn himself in for its theft, but Pym, aware of the use to which Lang had put the stolen goods, offered to let him keep them, provided he only use them to uphold the law.

Hero
Shortly after, Scott Lang donned the Ant-Man costume on various occasions, primarily to assist Iron Man and the Avengers. Scott came to the rescue when Iron Man was trapped in his armor in the aftermath of a system overload. He also helped Yellowjacket (Hank Pym's alias at the time) attempt to rescue the Wasp captured by Dr. Parnell Solomon, and alongside the Avengers he first battled Taskmaster. He then battled Odd John's mutated insects, and encountered Biotron of the Micronauts. Alongside Spider-Man, he again battled Taskmaster, exploiting Taskmaster's belief that he was Pym by using his growth capsules on one of his ants as a surprise tactic. As Lang, he attempted to stop the Raiders at a Dallas electronics engineers convention. He then battled the malfunctioning GARD computer security system at Stark International. As Lang, he aided Iron Man and Jim Rhodes against Mauler. He then met the Fantastic Four, and on their behalf first journeyed to a "micro-world", and joined the Thing in battle against its denizens.

Scott was instrumental in helping Iron Man discover who possessed copies of his technology during the "Armor Wars" storyline.

He also aided the Avengers in infiltrating Taskmaster's henchmen-training facility, battling the Taskmaster alongside Hawkeye, and visited Henry Pym while he was in prison. He encountered Rick Jones and Alpha Flight, and then battled Dire Wraiths alongside Rom and Starshine. Scott was serving in an Avengers back-up team created when Baron Helmut Zemo's Masters of Evil took control of the Mansion and captured some of the current team; he even helped the Wasp defeat the Absorbing Man and Titania when they attacked a hospital in an attempt to kill a comatose Hercules. He accidentally shrank Spider-Man and battled the Scarlet Beetle. He also battled Dragonfly.

Lang was briefly hired by the Fantastic Four to serve as their technical consultant when Reed Richards was missing and presumed dead. It was during this period that Lang learned that Cassie had long since found out about his double life as a superhero. Lang later returned to form a temporary Fantastic Four with the Human Torch, She-Hulk and Namorita when the other three were temporarily trapped in the Negative Zone.

Lang played an important role in helping Mister Fantastic cure the Hulk, who was suffering from Lou Gehrig's disease; using a cure devised by Leader, Lang shrank down to microscopic size, entered Hulk's genes, and replaced the damaged genes causing the disease with healthy genes taken from the corpse of Bruce Banner's father, the energy surge released when Hulk returned to human form integrating the new genes into Hulk's system and curing of the disease.

After his ex-wife Peggy Rae gained custody of their daughter, Lang accepted an offer to join the Avengers officially. His personality clashed immediately with fellow Avenger Jack of Hearts. However, in The Avengers vol. 3 #76, Jack helped save Cassie from a child-murderer, shortly before committing suicide by traveling into space with the murderer and exploding rather than return to the containment cells required to control his power.

He also appeared in the series Alias by Brian Michael Bendis, where he dated the leading character Jessica Jones, a former costumed superhero named Jewel who left that avocation to become a private investigator.

He assists her in a matter with Mattie Franklin, one of the many female heroes to take the Spider-Woman name. Assisting the duo is S.H.I.E.L.D. agent Clay Quartermain. Purple Man uses his powers to make it seem as if Scott had been consumed by ants.

"Death"
When Jack of Hearts reappears on the grounds of Avengers Mansion in a zombified state, Scott Lang rushes to Jack, only for Jack to blow himself up, destroying much of the mansion and seemingly killing Scott. This Jack may have been some type of "apparition" created by an insane Scarlet Witch rather than the actual Jack of Hearts, starting the crisis known as Avengers Disassembled.

His daughter Cassie Lang subsequently takes the name Stature as a member of the Young Avengers, having apparently taken enough Pym particles over the years to enable Cassie to automatically grow and shrink in size whenever she wants.

His Ant-Man helmet falls into Amadeus Cho's possession for a time with Cassie's blessing, choosing to focus on the insect mind-controlling abilities.

Return
During the events of the limited series Avengers: The Children's Crusade, Iron Lad takes the Young Avengers and an amnesiac Wanda Maximoff into the past, back to the day that the events of Avengers Disassembled began. Here, despite Iron Lad's assurance that they could not interact, Scott Lang is hugged by his daughter, and to take him away from the zombified Jack of Hearts who is revealed to be the real Jack of Hearts under the control of an insane Scarlet Witch. When Jack explodes, the Scarlet Witch regains her memories and returns them to the present, including Scott (thus his death is retconned as having never actually happened, as he was merely taken from his time and brought forward). Scott is proud that his daughter followed in his footsteps. However, a subsequent battle ensues (regarding the fate of the Scarlet Witch) involving the Avengers, Young Avengers, X-Men, Magneto, X-Factor and Doctor Doom. In the course of the fight, Scott is seemingly killed by Doom, although he actually survives relatively unscathed; enraged, Cassie attacks but Doom kills her, much to Scott's grief.

Afterwards, Scott joins the new Defenders team composed of Doctor Strange, Silver Surfer, Namor, Red She-Hulk, Iron Fist and Black Cat. Eventually, he became the second Future Foundation's leader replacing Reed Richards when the Fantastic Four went on a time travel trip. Still suffering from his daughter's death, he decided to aim all the Foundation's resources towards making Doctor Doom pay for his crime; in the meantime he engaged in a romantic relationship with Darla Deering, aka Ms. Thing.  It is to Darla that Scott confessed that he killed a fellow in-mate while in prison.

After a heated battle, Scott managed to exact his revenge on Doctor Doom by gradually overwhelming and defeating him, and by having him believe he had killed Valeria Richards. He also determined the true meaning of Pym Particles, and how they operate on three distinct axes determining size, strength and durability.

During the "AXIS" storyline, a now-heroic and repentant Doctor Doom used Scarlet Witch's powers to resurrect Cassandra Lang, seeking to atone for at least one of his crimes; she turned out alive and well on Scott's doorstep.

Following this, Lang moved to Miami to start a new life as well as to spend more time with his daughter. Scott later established Ant-Man Security Solutions. When he was attacked by Grizzly, mistaking him for Eric O'Grady unaware of the latter's death, Scott had to clear up the misunderstanding. Afterwards, Scott offered Grizzly a job in the company. When Cassie was kidnapped by Crossfire on behalf of Augustine Cross to use Cassie's Pym-particle irradiated heart could revive the very first villain Scott had fought, Scott was forced to turn to Grizzly and his fellow supervillain Machinesmith to infiltrate Cross' plant to save his daughter. With Machinesmith disabling all the security Scott was able to get into Cross Technologies and fight his way to Darren Cross, whom Dr. Sondheim was blackmailed into reviving using Cassie's heart. Darren engaged in combat against Ant-Man while the hero tried to buy time for Sondheim to transplant another heart into Cassie. After Cross was forced to flee when the Pym Particles now in his body caused him to shrink down, Scott shrank down to microscopic size, and was guided by Sondheim to attack Cassie's white cells and allow her body accept the new heart's tissue. Even though the procedure was difficult, Scott was finally able to help Cassie survive the experience. When Peggy and Blake arrived, Sondheim told her that Cassie suffered an infraction and Scott took them to her. Although he saved his daughter, Scott decided to distance himself from her so that she could have a normal life.

Some months ago, Ant-Man helped Giant-Man into rescuing a computer technician named Raz Malhotra from Egghead. Months later after the incident where Hank Pym and Ultron were fused together with Pym seemingly perishing as a result of the fusion, Scott received one of Pym's labs. Recalling his encounter with Raz, Scott sent Raz a present in the form of the Giant-Man suit.

During the "Last Days" part of the "Secret Wars" storyline, Ant-Man recovers an unnamed Asgardian artifact from Slug which he won from Mary Morgan in a game of contract bridge. Ant-Man delivers the goods to Mary Morgan where he learns that she is Miss Patriot. Mary Morgan revealed that Valhalla Villas is a retirement home for Golden Age heroes and villains where they live out their days in blissful remembrance. Mary Morgan then assembles the residents of Valhalla Villas like Golden Girl, Doctor Fear, Thunderer, Leopard Girl, Human Top, Sun Girl, American Ace, Flash Foster, and Wax Master. Using the Asgardian artifact, Mary Morgan rejuvenated the Valhalla Villa residents as Miami sees the unexpected resurgence of characters from the Golden Age. Mary decides to remain elderly since the past was too much to bear the first and only time. Scott then visits his ex-wife Peggy Rae in an attempt to see his daughter Cassandra Lang. Peggy puts Scott in his place due to him making no effort to visit her since she was in the hospital. Peggy also tells Scott that Cassandra is at a school excursion to Atlanta. While drinking at a nightclub, Ant-Man encounters Janice Lincoln and tries to take her down, only to get blasted. Janice states to Ant-Man that he should party like there is no tomorrow since it is the last night on Earth. Ant-Man takes in Janice's suggestions as they both hit the dance floor. He wakes up the next morning with Janice in his bed as the final parts of the Incursion occur.

As part of the "All-New, All-Different Marvel," Ant-Man becomes a target of Whirlwind when Power Broker offers a demonstration of the Hench App to Darren Cross. When Cross was unable to pay $12,000,000.00 to Power Broker, Whirlwind received orders to not attack Ant-Man. Ant-Man later helped Darla Deering when she was attacked by the second Magician (the son of the original Magician) when he was hired by a publicist named Marlena Howard through the Hench App to pretend to have a grudge against her.

Scott Lang later reunited with Raz Malhotra and took him to confront Power Broker at his public promotion of the Hench App 2.0. They ended up coming into conflict with a female Blacklash who Power Broker hired to guard the event. Due to Raz's inexperience in crimefighting, Blacklash got away. Following the incident, Scott Lang gave Raz an offer come with him to Florida to be trained while looking over Hank Pym's lab there. Raz accepted the offer.

Scott later recruited Hijacker, Whirlwind, Beetle, Voice, and Magician to his Ant-Man Security Solutions. As a team, they fought Darren Cross, Crossfire and Augustine Cross to save Stinger, aka Cassie Lang. After that battle, the NYPD arrested Scott for his crimes. After a trial, he was released.

During the "Secret Empire" storyline, Ant-Man joins the resistance group against HYDRA after they takeover the U.S. After seeing footage from Rick Jones, explaining Steve Rogers' conversion into HYDRA's supreme leader, Scott is among the heroes who join Hawkeye in the search for the Cosmic Cube fragments that were scattered around the world, so they could reform the Cube and restore Steve back to normal. After he smuggles Cassie out of the country, he offers Sam Wilson to join the resistance but Sam turns it down. Ant-Man then meets him at a bar, with a small group of heroes led by Hawkeye. Hawkeye and the Tony Stark A.I. manage to convince Sam to smuggle them out of the country so they can find the Cosmic Cube fragments. It is eventually revealed that HYDRA found and captured Cassie, forcing Scott to become a double agent in order to save her life. He confesses his treachery just as HYDRA's forces arrive and destroy the resistance's hideout. During the final battle, Scott shrinks Bucky Barnes down so that he can enter the Cosmic Cube and reawaken Kobik. This ultimately allows Kobik to bring back the original Steve Rogers, who defeats his HYDRA doppelganger.

With his reputation tarnished due to his betrayal, Scott joins the Guardians of the Galaxy in order to get away from Earth for a while. During a later attempt to coordinate a return to Earth for Cassie's birthday with Nadia van Dyne's aid, things go quickly awry, and the two of them experience a series of bizarre adventures in the microverse before returning home. However, in the process the two of them became quantum-entangled with each other.

Hero for Hire
Trying to pick up the pieces of his lost life on Earth, Scott takes up residence in an ant-hill in Florida and begins offering his service for pay. On a mission, he ends up joining forces with Swarm against a new enemy called Macrothrax.

Powers and abilities
Using a gaseous form of "Pym particles" kept in a compartment in his belt, Ant-Man initially had the power to shrink himself (and other people and objects along with himself) to the size of an ant and return to normal. Over time, he has acquired the ability to change size at will. He can also shrink to sub-microscopic size, and thereby enter the countless "subatomic universes". He retains his normal strength in ant size.

The cybernetic Ant-Man helmet allows rudimentary telepathic communication with insects, and is equipped with sound amplification equipment allowing normal-sized humans to hear its wearer. The helmet also has a retractable plexiglass face shield and a limited air supply.

Lang has advanced training and expertise in electronics, having earned an electronics technician certificate, plus additional advanced electronics training he received while in prison. At times, Lang even made his own modifications to the Ant-Man equipment, such as installing the Pym gas dispenser in his helmet rather than leaving it on his belt, or mounting an electric disruptor into his helmet for offensive purposes.

Other versions

MC2
In the MC2 universe, Lang appears in two distinct versions. The Lang of the main MC2 continuity has long retired from the Avengers and has acted as a mentor for Cassie, who has taken up the role of the family superhero. Also, the Thunder Guard, a group of Nazi Avengers from an alternate universe who fought A-Next, included a mentally highly unstable version of Scott called "Pincer" who had killed that universe's version of Cassie.

Ultimate Marvel
The Ultimate Marvel version of the character is David "Dave" Scotty, one of the Giant-Men that was utilized on the Ultimates' Reserves. During a legion of vampires' attack, he was among those that guard the S.H.I.E.L.D. Triskelion. After vampires attack and bit him multiple times, Scotty turned into a vampire. In the ensuing battle, Dave gets killed by Peter, a fellow Giant-Man.

The actual Ultimate version of Scott Lang is the second major version of Giant-Man. Dr. Lang appears as a member of the New Ultimates during a massive showdown between the Ultimates and the Avengers. Lang later helps both teams defeat Gregory Stark's forces in North Korea. His daughter Cassie later joins the Ultimates.

What If?
In "What If Iron Man Lost the Armor Wars", Lang is captured while spying on Justin Hammer, and taken prisoner along with Cassie. When Hammer is later assassinated and his knowledge over the Iron Man armor claimed by A.I.M., Scott and Cassie are taken hostage by them as well, but are eventually freed by Stark clad in the Firepower armor.

In other media

Television
 Scott Lang / Ant-Man appears in The Avengers: Earth's Mightiest Heroes, voiced by Crispin Freeman.
 Scott Lang / Ant-Man appears in Avengers Assemble, voiced by Grant George in the first three seasons and by Josh Keaton in the last two.
 Scott Lang / Ant-Man appears in Ultimate Spider-Man, voiced again by Grant George.
 Scott Lang / Ant-Man appears in Lego Marvel Super Heroes: Avengers Reassembled, voiced again by Grant George.
 Scott Lang / Ant-Man appears in Guardians of the Galaxy, voiced again by Grant George in season two and by Josh Keaton in season three.
 Scott Lang / Ant-Man appears in a Coke Mini commercial that premiered during Super Bowl 50, with Paul Rudd reprising his role from the Marvel Cinematic Universe films.
 Scott Lang / Ant-Man appears in a series of self-titled animated shorts, voiced again by Josh Keaton.
 Scott Lang / Ant-Man appears in Spidey and His Amazing Friends, voiced by Sean Giambrone.

Marvel Cinematic Universe

Paul Rudd portrays Scott Lang / Ant-Man in the live-action Marvel Cinematic Universe films Ant-Man, Captain America: Civil War, Ant-Man and the Wasp, Avengers: Endgame, and Ant-Man and the Wasp: Quantumania. Additionally, Rudd voices an alternate timeline version of Lang in the Disney+ animated series What If...? episode "What If... Zombies?!"

Video games
 Scott Lang / Ant-Man appears as a playable character in Marvel Heroes, voiced again by Grant George.
 Scott Lang / Ant-Man appears as a playable character in Marvel: Avengers Alliance.
 Scott Lang / Ant-Man appears in Marvel Contest of Champions.
 Scott Lang / Ant-Man appears in Marvel: Future Fight.
 Scott Lang / Ant-Man appears as a playable character in Disney Infinity 3.0.
 Scott Lang / Ant-Man appears as a playable character in Marvel Puzzle Quest.
 Scott Lang / Ant-Man appears in Marvel Pinball.
 The MCU incarnation of Scott Lang / Ant-Man appears as DLC for Lego Marvel's Avengers.
 The MCU incarnation of Scott Lang / Ant-Man appears in Lego Marvel Super Heroes 2.
 Scott Lang / Ant-Man appears as a non-playable character in Marvel Ultimate Alliance 3: The Black Order, voiced again by Josh Keaton.

Miscellaneous
The MCU incarnation of Scott Lang / Ant-Man appears in the Ant-Man and The Wasp: Nano Battle! attraction at Hong Kong Disneyland, with Paul Rudd reprising his role from the films.

Collected editions

References

Sources

Further reading

External links
 Ant-Man (Scott Lang) at Marvel.com
 Marvel Directory: Ant Man II

Ant-Man
Avengers (comics) characters
Characters created by David Michelinie
Characters created by John Byrne (comics)
Comics characters introduced in 1979
Fictional characters from Florida
Fictional characters who can change size
Fictional electrical engineers
Fictional professional thieves
Marvel Comics American superheroes
Marvel Comics male superheroes
Marvel Comics mutates
Marvel Comics telepaths